The  was a class of submarine in the Imperial Japanese Navy (IJN), which served during the Second World War. The Type-A submarines were built to take a role of the command ships for submarine squadrons. For this reason they had equipment for a headquarters, better radio facilities and a floatplane.

Class variants
The Type-A submarines were divided into four classes: 
 
 
 
 . The 5094th vessel class boats were not built and remained only a design.

Type-A (I-9 class)

Project number S35Ja. Their design was based on the Junsen III (I-7 class). Three boats were built in 1938-42 under the Maru 3 Programme (Boat # 35 - 36) and Maru 4 Programme (Boat # 138).

Boats in class

Type-A Mod.1 (I-12 class)

Project number S35B. Five boats were planned under the Maru Tsui Programme (Boat # 620 - 621) and the Kai-Maru 5 Programme (Boat # 5091 - 5093). They were equipped with less powerful diesel engines which shortened the time needed to build them. Only one boat, was completed to the original design. The I-13 and the later boats were converted to a new submarine class (I-13 class), because the number of I-400 class boats was reduced.
Boats in class

Type-A Mod.2 (I-13 class)

Project number S35C. Four boats were planned under the Maru Tsui Programme (Boat # 621) and the Kai-Maru 5 Programme (Boat # 5091 - 5093). However, four boats were converted to new submarine class (I-13 class), because a number of submarines of the I-400 class were cancelled. They had a large hangar and were equipped with bulges to be able to operate 2 × special Aichi M6A1 Seiran attack bombers. The headquarters institutions were removed.

Boats in class

V21 Type
Project number S48. Three boats were planned under the Kai-Maru 5 Programme.

Boats in class

Characteristics

Footnotes

Bibliography
, History of Pacific War Vol.17 "I-Gō Submarines", Gakken (Japan), January 1998, 
Rekishi Gunzō, History of Pacific War Vol.63 "Documents of IJN submarines and USN submarines", Gakken (Japan), January 2008, 
Rekishi Gunzō, History of Pacific War Extra, "Perfect guide, The submarines of the Imperial Japanese Forces", Gakken (Japan), March 2005, 
Model Art Extra No.537, Drawings of Imperial Japanese Naval Vessels Part-3, Model Art Co. Ltd. (Japan), May 1999, Book code 08734-5
The Maru Special, Japanese Naval Vessels No.13, "Japanese submarines I-13 class and I-400 class", Ushio Shobō (Japan), July 1977, Book code 8343-7
The Maru Special, Japanese Naval Vessels No.31, "Japanese Submarines I", Ushio Shobō (Japan), September 1979, Book code 68343-31
Senshi Sōsho Vol.88 Naval armaments and war preparation (2), "And after the outbreak of war", Asagumo Simbun (Japan), October 1975

See also
 Cruiser submarine

Submarine classes
 
Submarines of the Imperial Japanese Navy